Levent Açıkgöz (born 4 January 1971) is a retired Turkish footballer and football manager. Levent is best known for his association with Kardemir Karabükspor where he played with in the Süper Lig and TFF First League, and also begun his professional managerial career.

Managerial career
Levent has taken on a role as a caretaker coach for Karabükspor on several occasions after previous managers quit the club. His usual position was as a youth coach.

References

External links
 
 TFF Manager Profile
 
 Mackolik Manager Profile

1971 births
Living people
Sportspeople from Zonguldak
Turkish footballers
Turkish football managers
Kardemir Karabükspor footballers
Boluspor footballers
Zeytinburnuspor footballers
Giresunspor footballers
Kocaelispor footballers
Süper Lig players
TFF First League players
TFF Second League players
Kardemir Karabükspor managers
Süper Lig managers
Association football defenders